Foz Allan is a British producer and screenwriter.

Career
He trained as an actor at Rose Bruford College of Speech and Drama. He began his career as an Associate Director at the Bristol Old Vic Theatre and a Radio Drama producer with productions for BBC Radio 4, Radio Wales and the BBC World Service while his career in television started in 1996 when he worked as an executive producer on Satellite City. He is known for his work as the creator of popular BBC drama Robin Hood, the first series of the CBBC show The Dumping Ground, and more recently Sky Atlantic's Riviera. He was the executive producer of the 2022 Netflix series Treason (TV series).

Allan founded his own production company, Brycoed.

Television

Producer
2022: Treason (TV series) (Executive Producer)
2017: Riviera by Neil Jordan (Producer)
2015:         Jerkyll and Hyde series 1 by Charlie Higson (Series Producer) 
2014:         Hetty Feather series 1 adaptation of novel by Jacqueline Wilson (Executive Producer) 
2014:        "Harriet's Army" 90 mins family drama by Guy Burt (Producer)
2012-2013: Wolfblood series 2 (Producer)
2013: The Dumping Ground (BAFTA: Best Children's Series)(Executive Producer)
2011-2012: Wolfblood (Winner:  Royal Television Society, Banff 'Rockie', BAFTA) (Originating Producer)
2006-2009: Robin Hood (2006 TV series) (Co-Creator and Executive Producer)
2006: Vital Signs (Executive Producer)
2006: Pinochet in Suburbia (Executive Producer)
2002-2003: Casualty BAFTA NOMINATION (Series Producer)
2000-2002: Belonging  BAFTA CYMRU Best Drama (Originating Producer/ Executive Producer)
2001: Score (Producer)
1999: High Hopes: Saving Private Ryan
1999: Hang the DJ (Producer)
1997 - 1999 - Two Lives international: Washed Up BAFTA CYMRU Best Drama, Tattoo You (Director/Producer)
1996-1998: Satellite City (Executive Producer)

Screenwriter
Robin Hood
Something Worth Fighting For, Part 2
Something Worth Fighting For, Part 1
The Enemy of My Enemy
Bad Blood
A Dangerous Deal

References

External links

British male screenwriters
British male television writers
British television producers
English television writers
Living people
Year of birth missing (living people)